Gollenberg is a municipality in the Havelland district, in Brandenburg, Germany consisting of Schönholz-Neuwerder, Stölln and Ohnewitz.

History
The municipality is named after the Gollenberg near Stölln and was created December 31, 2002 when the municipalities of Schönholz-Neuwerder and Stölln were merged.

Demography

Aviation

Otto Lilienthal

Aviation pioneer Otto Lilienthal (1848–1896) crashed his glider here and died later.

Lady Agnes

On October 23, 1989, an Ilyushin Il-62 jet airliner was intentionally landed on the 900m short grass airfield of Stölln/Rhinow in a risky maneuver. The jet, donated by the GDR's airline Interflug and nicknamed "Lady Agnes" after Lilienthal's wife, is now used for weddings.

Air sport events at Stölln/Rhinow airfield

 The 23rd national youth gliding competition Bundesjugendvergleichsfliegen (not to be mixed with Junior Nationals) took place in Stölln/Rhinow in 2007.
 The 2007 club championships in glider aerobatics "Salzmann Cup" took place at Stölln/Rhinow airfield.
 Since 2004, the cross-country soaring competition "Cats Cradle Club Cup" takes place at Stölln/Rhinow airfield regularly.
 About 100 pilots participated in the fly-in for celebrating '100 years human flight' in May 1991.

References

External links
https://web.archive.org/web/20070928083541/http://www.otto-lilienthal.de/lady.htm

Localities in Havelland